CRTV may refer to:

 Open University of China (formerly China Central Radio and TV University)
 Cameroon Radio Television
 Conservative Review Television
 CreaTV San Jose
 CRTV (Cesari Response Television), founded by Rick Cesari